Ilan ( in Hebrew) is an Israeli masculine given name and a surname which means "tree" in the Hebrew language. 

Variants of the name include Alon and Elon. Notable people with the name include:

Given name
Ilan Averbuch (born 1953), Israeli sculptor 
Ilan Bakhar (born 1975), Israeli football player
Ilan Ben-Dov (born 1957), Israeli businessman 
Ilan Berman (born 1975), American political scientist
Ilan Chester (born 1952), Venezuelan singer
Ilan Chet (born 1939), Israeli microbiologist, President of the Weizmann Institute of Science
Ilan Davis, Professor of Cell Biology at the University of Oxford
Ilan Eshkeri (born 1977), British composer
Ilan Gilon (born 1956), Israeli politician
Ilan Goldfajn (born 1966), Brazilian-Israeli economist and President of the Central Bank of Brazil
Ilan Halevi (1943–2013), Palestinian writer
Ilan Hall (born 1982), American chef
Ilan Kidron (born 1976), Australian musician
Ilan Meyer (born 1956), American epidemiologist
Ilan Mitchell-Smith (born 1969), American actor
Ilan Moskovitch (born 1966), Israeli filmmaker
Ilan Pappé (born 1954), Israeli historian
Ilan Ramon (1954–2003), Israeli pilot and astronaut
Ilan Rechtman (born 1963), Israeli musician
Ilan Rubin (born 1988), American drummer
Ilan Shalgi (born 1945), Israeli politician
Ilan Shiloah (born 1957), Israeli businessman
Ilan Shohat (born 1974), Israeli politician
Ilan Shor (born 1987), Moldovan hideaway businessman and politician.
Ilan Stavans (born 1961) Mexican writer
Ilan Volkov (born 1976), Israeli conductor

Surname
Eli Ilan (1928–1982), Israeli sculptor
Meir Bar-Ilan (1880–1949), Israeli rabbi
Tal Ilan (born 1956), Israeli historian
Tova Ilan (born 1929), Israeli educator
Uri Ilan (1935–1955), Israeli soldier

See also
Alon (name)
Elon (name)
Ilana

Hebrew masculine given names
Hebrew-language surnames